The Balilla class were the first submarines to be built for the Italian navy following the end of World War I. They were large ocean-going cruiser submarines designed to operate in the Indian Ocean based in Italy's East African colonies. The design was double-hulled and based on the German Type UE 2 U-boats, one of which,  was supplied to the Italians as a war reparation. A  auxiliary diesel engine was installed as an extra generator.

During the war, the boats were stationed in the Mediterranean in 1940 but proved too large to be effective patrol submarines. After 1941 they were used as transport submarines to supply Italian forces in North Africa. The surviving boats were scrapped after the war.

One submarine, was built for the Brazilian Navy to a modified design.

Design
The boats displaced 1,427 tons surfaced and 1874 tons submerged. The boats were considered to have poor stability.

The submarines were powered by two Fiat diesels for surface cruising and two Savigliano electric motors for use while submerged driving two shafts. These created  and  respectively. The second diesel engine was for auxiliary purposes and for recharging the batteries, novel at the time of the boats construction. This gave the ships a speed of  surfaced and  submerged. However, the initial design called for the ability to reach speeds of  surfaced and  submerged; the subs never reached these marks.

The Ballila class was armed with six  torpedo tubes with four located in the bow and two in the stern. The submarines carried a load of 16 torpedoes, with two reloads for each bow tube and one reload for each stern tube.

The class was also armed with one 1924 model /27 calibre deck gun that was placed in a shielded mounting in the forward section of the conning tower. In 1934, the class underwent a refit that upgraded the model to a /45 calibre gun. The ships also received two  machine guns placed two single mounts.

Humaytá sub-class
Humaytá was ordered by the Brazilian navy as a deep-diving submarine. Modifications to the standard Ballila design include the placement of the diesel and electric motors further forward, the elimination of the bow planes and a different distribution of the ballast tanks throughout the submarine. The vessel displaced 1,390 tons surfaced and 1,884 tons submerged.

The submarine was powered by two Ansaldo diesels with one electric motor creating  and  respectively. This gave the ship a speed of  surfaced and  submerged.

Humaytá differed in armament too. The submarine was equipped with the six  torpedo tubes with four located in the bow and two in the stern. However, the vessel had only a  deck gun and carried 16 mines.

Ships
All ships were built by OTO in Muggiano. Humaytá was a modified version of this design built for the Brazilian Navy in 1927. The ship was retired in 1950.

See also
 Italian submarines of World War II

Notes

Bibliography

External links
 Balilla-class submarine Marina Militare website
Balilla Class at Battleships-cruisers.co.uk

Submarine classes
 
 Balilla